The Melsheimer FM-1 is an American single-seat, high-wing, FAI Open Class glider that was designed and constructed by Frank Melsheimer.

Design and development
The FM-1 was first flown in 1968. The designation indicates the designer's initials.

The FM-1 features mixed construction. The aft fuselage and wings are constructed from wood, with the forward fuselage made from welded steel tubing, covered in fibreglass. The wing employs a NACA 4400R airfoil. The aircraft was originally constructed with a T-tail, but this was later changed to a conventional low tail. The cockpit accommodation is one seat in a semi-reclining position.

Only one example was completed and registered in the Experimental - Amateur-built category.

Operational history
As of May 2011 the FM-1 was still on the Federal Aviation Administration registry.

Specifications (FM-1)

See also

References

1960s United States sailplanes
Homebuilt aircraft
Aircraft first flown in 1968